Frederick George Coppins  (25 October 1889 – 20 March 1963) was a Canadian recipient of the Victoria Cross, the highest and most prestigious award for gallantry in the face of the enemy that can be awarded to British and Commonwealth forces. He was born in England and served with the Royal West Kent Regiment before the First World War. He then emigrated to Canada, settling in Winnipeg.

Details
He was 28 years old, and a corporal in the 8th Battalion, Canadian Expeditionary Force during the First World War when the following deed took place for which he was awarded the VC.

On 9 August 1918 at Hatchet Woods, near Amiens, France, Corporal Coppins' platoon came unexpectedly under fire of numerous machine-guns. It was not possible to advance or retire and there was no cover. Corporal Coppins, calling on four men to follow him, leapt forward in the face of intense machine-gun fire and rushed straight for the guns. The four men with him were killed and he was wounded, but going on alone, he killed the operator of the first gun and three of the crew and took four prisoners. Despite his wound, he then continued with his platoon to the final objective.

Later life 
After the war, he returned to Winnipeg. He enlisted as a special constable during the Winnipeg General Strike.  Within hours of his appointment, he charged his horse into a gathering of strikers and was dragged off his horse and severely pummelled.

Coppins played a minor role in the 1930 film All Quiet on the Western Front, as a German machine gunner.

A record exists for his enlistment in World War II at Angel's Camp Calaveras Co. California aged 50 but it is unknown what role he played. He later moved to California where he died. He is interred at the Chapel of the Chimes columbarium in Oakland, California. Coppins' medals are located in a collection at the Royal Winnipeg Rifles Museum, Winnipeg, Manitoba.

References

External links
 Frederick George Coppins digitized service file
 Legion Magazine
 Canadian Forces biography
 Canadian veterans biography
 Canadian Great War biography
 List of Canadian Victoria Cross recipients

Canadian World War I recipients of the Victoria Cross
1889 births
1963 deaths
English emigrants to Canada
People from the Borough of Ashford
Canadian Expeditionary Force soldiers
Canadian emigrants to the United States
Canadian police officers
Queen's Own Royal West Kent Regiment soldiers
People of the Winnipeg general strike
Canadian military personnel of World War I
Canadian Army soldiers
Royal Winnipeg Rifles soldiers
Military personnel from Kent
Royal Winnipeg Rifles